Jack Andrew Jans or Jack Wilkie-Jans is an Aboriginal affairs advocate, contemporary multi-media artist (film, paint, photography), writer, and politologist.

Born in Cairns, Tropical Far North Queensland, he is of mixed heritage (British, Danish and Indigenous Australian – Waanyi, Teppathiggi and Tjungundji tribes).

Aboriginal Affairs 
In recent years Jack's work as an Aboriginal affairs advocate has increased as both a political commentator and journalist. Known for his commentary of Cape York Peninsula issues, deaths in custody, economic development in remote regions and contemporary Indigenous current affairs, he is known at times for his controversy in critiquing long-standing Government programmes and their approach to Indigenous peoples.
He is perhaps most known for lobbying against the Alcohol Management Plans & Welfare Reform Trials in Cape York Peninsula (a region known for high unemployment), arguing that focus ought to be placed on addressing solutions to the issues of economic ostracisation and welfare dependency.

In 2014 Jack became one of the youngest board members to be elected to Cape York Sustainable Futures Inc. which is Cape York's peak organisation for economic & community development. In 2018 Jack stood down as Deputy Chair of the organisation and resigned from the board. He remains a keen advocate for the economic advancement of the Cape York Peninsula region in his role as a freelance contributor to Australia's Special Broadcasting Service (SBS) National Indigenous Television's (NITV) online platform.

Despite being a self-described conservative, in 2015 Jack spoke up against the proposed forced closures of remote Aboriginal communities in Western Australia as alluded to under the then Liberal Party of Australia government led by former Western Australian Premier, Colin Barnett. He drew comparisons to the proposed policy with the forced closure of his family's home town of Mapoon, on the Western Cape, Cape York Peninsula in 1963. Furthermore, Jack urged for greater economic develop in regional & remote areas, in Western Australia and Cape York Peninsula, in order for small towns & communities to become viable.

Art and culture 
Having an early start in a career in the arts, in October 2011 Jack was named an alumnus of, and was one of 10 indigenous Australian artists & arts-workers to travel to, the National Gallery of Australia in Canberra for the second Wesfarmer's Indigenous Arts Leadership Programme.

Since helping to establish and run the Artist Run Initiative, Cell Art Space. Jack's career has remained steady as an exhibiting artist with Umi Arts and has grown to freelance event management and to involve critical and review writing.  In 2017 Jack was involved in securing grant funding for the Australia: Defending the Oceans which is, to date, the largest international touring showcase of contemporary Indigenous sculpture.

Jack is known within the Australian art industry for his stance on hoping to achieve more sustainable approaches to arts funding, believing philanthropy ought to play a larger role in supporting the arts industry over solely public funds, a topic he has written at length about in the media.

Criticisms 
In 2011 the then Editor at Large of The Cairns Post and one time Member for Cairns, Gavin King, wrote an editorial calling Jack a "bizarre candidate". The article was published shortly after Jack had announced to the Cairns media that he intended to run for Local Government. The article mainly sited artistic photographs found on Jack's artists' website.

Due to his short-lived campaign a local, anonymous political blog site, Hillbilly Watch, criticised Jack of being "uninterested" in Local Government concerns and of self-promotion.

Family 
Notable relatives of Jack include Aboriginal leader, Jean Aileen Little (his maternal Grandmother), as well as renowned Australian sculptor & ceramicist, the late Dr. Thancoupie Fletcher James AO (who was his Tribal Grandmother). Also, he is a [maternal] Great Grand Nephew of land rights activist, Denny Bowenda.

Awards 
In 2013 Jack was a nominee for the Cairns Region Australia Day Awards for the Cultural Award, both for his work with supporting local charities and the arts. In 2015 he was named an Associate Fellow of the Royal Commonwealth Society. In 2017 he was named as one of the Queen's Baton Bearers for the 2018 Commonwealth Games.

Qualifications 
Jack holds a bachelor's degree of arts, majoring in Politics & International Affairs from James Cook University. 
He is currently engaged as the Cairns Indigenous Art Fair's Marketing & Communications Manager.

References

External links 
 

1992 births
Living people
Cairns, Queensland
Far North Queensland
Fellows of the Royal Commonwealth Society